Algernon Frederick Greville (29 December 1798  – 15 December 1864) was an English soldier, cricketer, and officer of arms who served as private secretary to the Duke of Wellington.

Life
He was commissioned an ensign in the Grenadier Guards on 1 February 1814, and fought with that regiment at Quatre Bras and Waterloo. He was also present at the capture of Péronne, and soon after was appointed aide-de-camp to General Sir John Lambert. He later became ADC to the Duke of Wellington, and served on his staff until the end of the occupation of France.

The Duke made him his private secretary upon being appointed Master-General of the Ordnance in 1819, and he continued to serve in this capacity when Wellington was made commander-in-chief (1827), prime minister (1828), foreign secretary (1834), and commander-in-chief again (1842).

Greville was appointed Bath King of Arms in 1829, and served as secretary to the Cinque Ports while Wellington was Lord Warden. He died in 1864 in Hillingdon.

Family
Greville was the second son of Charles Greville, himself a son of Fulke Greville and descendant of both the Duke of Beaufort and the Baron Brooke, and Lady Charlotte Cavendish-Bentinck, the daughter of William Cavendish-Bentinck, 3rd Duke of Portland and also granddaughter of William Cavendish, 4th Duke of Devonshire. He was the brother of Charles Cavendish Fulke Greville, the diarist, and of Henry William Greville.
He married Charlotte Maria Cox (d. 10 April 1841) on 7 April 1823, by whom he had five children:
Frances Harriett Greville (8 March 1824 – 8 March 1887), married Charles Gordon-Lennox, 6th Duke of Richmond on 28 November 1843
Georgiana Maria Greville (3 May 1826 – 14 January 1872)
Lt. Col. Arthur Charles Greville (18 May 1827 – 27 May 1901)
Augusta Mary Greville (24 June 1831 – 1921), married George Montagu Warren Sandford in 1858
Lt. Cavendish Hubert Greville (3 September 1835 – 5 November 1854), killed at the Battle of Inkerman

Cricket
Greville made 7 known appearances in first-class matches from 1815 until 1823. He was mainly associated with Marylebone Cricket Club (MCC) but also played for Middlesex and Hampshire.

References

External sources
 CricketArchive record

1798 births
1864 deaths
British Army personnel of the Napoleonic Wars
Deputy Lieutenants of Middlesex
English cricketers
English cricketers of 1787 to 1825
Grenadier Guards officers
Marylebone Cricket Club cricketers
Gentlemen cricketers
Hampshire cricketers
Middlesex cricketers
Algernon
George Osbaldeston's XI cricketers